Falcioni is an Italian surname. Notable people with the surname include:

Davide Falcioni (born 1975), Italian footballer
Julio César Falcioni (born 1956), Argentine footballer and manager
Mónica Falcioni (born 1968), Uruguayan long and triple jumper

Italian-language surnames